Fotos are a German indie rock band from Hamburg/Cologne.

History
Fotos'               first self-titled album was released through Labels (a Sublabel of EMI) on 29 September 2006. Fotos can be characterised as British-inspired indie rock in connection with German lyrics.
In summer 2007, the band played at the German Hurricane Festival and Southside Festival as well as at the Austrian FM4 Frequency Festival. Following the release of their second album Nach dem Goldrausch on 28 March 2008, the band went on tour in Germany and Austria, and played several gigs at festivals in China. They played recently at German music festival organised by Max Mueller Bhavan in Pune, India and also at Delhi Public School Bangalore South where they were opened by the school's rock band "Velocity".
In 2008, the band's song "Fotos" was used as a Channel 4 "Try Life in Another Language" advert. In February 2009, Fotos represented the state of Lower Saxony at the Bundesvision Song Contest in Potsdam with their song "Du fehlst mir", ending on position No. 15.

Discography

Albums 
2006: Fotos (Labels (EMI)).
2008: Nach dem Goldrausch (Labels (EMI)).
2010: Porzellan
2017: Kids
2021: Auf zur Illumination!

Videography 
 Komm zurück (external link: youtube)
 Giganten (external link: youtube)
 Ich bin für dich da (external link: youtube) 
 Nach dem Goldrausch (external link: youtube)
 Explodieren (external link: youtube)

References

External links
Official website
Fotos at Last.fm

German musical groups
German indie rock groups
Participants in the Bundesvision Song Contest